Road Fighter is the third studio album by South Korean boy band SechsKies. It was released on July 15, 1998, by DSP Entertainment. It is most notable for featuring the hit single "Reckless Love". This album would be followed by a special album, called Special, noted as their 3.5 album, which contains the hit song "Couple".

Overview
Following the success of their last album Welcome to the Sechskies Land with the promotional single, "Chivalry", which was the number-one song for five weeks on SBS Inkigayo, the group went on a national tour around major cities in South Korea. In March 1998, their own movie, titled Seventeen, was filmed during the production of the Road Fighter album, which both would be released in July of that year just a few days apart.

For about a week and a half, Sechskies starred in a Korean version play called Alibaba and the 40 Thieves. This play ran from April 25 to May 5.

Sechskies appeared on Inkigayo on July 5, 1998, to promote the release of their next album, Road Fighter with the song "Crying Game". The group then performed with the songs "Road Fighter" in the months of July and August, then "Reckless Love" in the months of September and October after the album's release. Both of the songs received number-one song awards on music programs Inkigayo and Music Bank. The success of promotions were followed by the release of another album, named Special, which contains the entire soundtrack heard in their movie, Seventeen. The special album contains the hit song "Couple", which won many awards on music shows, and sparked their first appearance on MBC's Music Camp.

Track listing
Credits.

References

1998 albums
Sechs Kies albums